KAL Legian is an Indonesian naval vessel.

Notable deployments
Legian and KRI Cobra helped recover 22 of the bodies of the deceased from the Levina 1.

References

Ships of the Indonesian Navy
Naval ships of Indonesia